Joseph Barton Elam, Sr. (June 12, 1821 – July 4, 1885), was a two-term Democratic U.S. representative for Louisiana's 4th congressional district, whose service corresponded with the administration of U.S. President Rutherford B. Hayes.

Early life and education
Elam was born near Hope in Hempstead County in southwestern Arkansas Territory, to William Jefferson Elam, a teacher, and his wife, the former Cynthia Wheaton, both from Virginia. The Elam family moved in 1823 to Ayish Bayou near San Augustine in East Texas, where another son, Charles Wheaton Elam, was born. In 1826, the Elams relocated to Natchitoches, Louisiana, where Mary Jane Elam, was born. By 1833, the family moved to Fort Jessup, Louisiana, the westernmost outpost of the United States at that time. William Elam tutored the officers' sons. Another son, John Waddill Elam, was born at Fort Jesup in 1833. There was also a daughter, Henrietta Elam.

The Elam children were educated at Fort Jessup. Later, Joseph Elam read law with his cousin John Waddill in Alexandria, Louisiana. In 1853, Waddill helped obtain freedom of Solomon Northup, a kidnapped man from New York and the subject of the film, Twelve Years a Slave, who had been sold into slavery in Louisiana. Northup had been held for twelve years as a slave in the Red River region. Under its 1841 law, the state of New York commissioned an attorney to help find and free the kidnapped man.

Elam was admitted to the bar in October 1843 and began his practice in Alexandria. He moved in 1844 to Sabine Parish and settled in the parish seat of Many.

Political career

Elam helped to establish the court system in DeSoto Parish, where on August 7, 1843, he made his first court appearance as an attorney. In 1845, Elam was elected to the Sabine Parish Police Jury, the parish governing body. He was the jury president from 1846 to 1847. Elam also served as the district attorney of Sabine Parish.
In 1847, Elam drafted the articles for incorporation for the town of Mansfield, and was elected as its first mayor.  He served as mayor a second time in 1856. He was also a Mansfield alderman.

Elam was elected to the Louisiana House of Representatives from DeSoto Parish. He served as the House Speaker from 1862 to 1864. His brother, John Waddill Elam, was elected sheriff of DeSoto Parish.

In 1861, Elam was elected a delegate to the Confederate Constitutional Convention and signed the Louisiana Ordinance of Secession on January 26, 1861.

In November 1865, he was elected as a state representative in the post-civil war Reconstruction legislature; this tenure is not reflected in the website, "Membership of the Louisiana House of Representatives, 1812-2016." Elam served in the state legislature until the passage in 1867 by Congress of the Reconstruction Acts. Elam attended the National Union Convention as a delegate from Louisiana in 1866.

During Reconstruction, the Radical Republicans took control of Louisiana, and Elam was temporarily disfranchised under the Louisiana Constitution of 1868, which prevented former officers of the Confederacy from running for office for a limited period. When in 1870, section 99 of this Constitution was repealed, Elam was allowed again to seek office.

Because of violence and intimidation associated with elections, conducted in part by the Ku Klux Klan trying to suppress black and other Republican voting, the Radicals passed legislation in 1870 to establish "returning boards," which were authorized to review elections and dismiss results from ones in which fraud was committed. That year, the U. S. Congress passed the Force Act, intended to aid in suppressing the power of the KKK in the South.

Elam was denied office in 1870, 1872 and 1874 by the returning boards. In 1870, Elam stopped a riot by speaking to and calming a crowd after an election was taken from him, and did the same in 1872. The Wheeler Adjustment, passed by the Louisiana legislature in March 1875, did not allow Elam to take his Louisiana State Senate seat for the 1874 election. The elections continued to be marked by violence by the White League, a paramilitary group that supported the Democratic Party, disrupted Republican gatherings and worked to suppress black voting.

In 1876, Elam, a secessionist and former Confederate  state legislator, was elected to the United States Congress in the Forty-fifth Congress. A national political compromise of that year allowed him and other Democrats to take office, along with the accession of Republican Rutherford Hayes as President. Elam was reelected to the Forty-sixth Congress for Louisiana's 4th district.

During his reelection campaign of 1878, Elam was severely injured in a stagecoach accident. In 1881, he returned to Louisiana to practice law in Mansfield, where he died at the age of sixty-three.

Personal life
Elam was twice widowed and had eight children by his third wife, Harriet Spencer Elam. Son Charles Wheaton Elam, the brother of Joseph Elam, Jr., served in the Louisiana House from 1892 to 1896, and Joseph Barton Elam, Jr., was the mayor of Mansfield from 1914 to 1920.

His younger sister, Henrietta Elam, married William B. Spencer, who was elected to the United States House of Representatives in the 1870s for Louisiana's 5th congressional district.

One of Elam's granddaughters, Margaret Taylor Elam Drew (1919–1977), was the first wife of R. Harmon Drew, Sr. of Minden, who was from 1972 to 1978 a state representative from Webster Parish in northwestern Louisiana. Their son Harmon Drew, Jr., also of Minden, is a judge of the Louisiana Court of Appeals for the Second Circuit, based in Shreveport.

Citations

References
Chambers, Henry E., A History of Louisiana, the American Historical Society, Inc., (1925)
Fortier, Alcée, Louisiana, Southern Historical Association, (1909)
Biographical Dictionary of Louisiana, Louisiana Historical Society, (1988)
Biographical History of Northwest Louisiana, Southern Press, (1889)
1850 United States Census, Sabine Parish, Louisiana
1860 United States Census, DeSoto Parish
United States Congressional Record 1877-1881
Northup, Solomon, Twelve Years a Slave
La. Acts of the Leg. No. 128, 1847
DeSoto Parish History Vols. 1 & 2, DeSoto Historical Society, 1995, 2004.
Journal of the Confederate Congress, Vol. 7, pgs. 14-15,1864.
 DeSoto Parish Clerk of Court records
 Sabine Parish Clerk of Court records
Tunnell, Ted, Edge of the Sword: The Ordeal of Carpetbagger Marshal H. Twitchell, LSU Press (2004)
Tunnell, Ted, Crucible of Reconstruction, LSU Press (1984)

1821 births
1885 deaths
People from Hope, Arkansas
District attorneys in Louisiana
People of Louisiana in the American Civil War
People from San Augustine County, Texas
Politicians from Natchitoches, Louisiana
Politicians from Alexandria, Louisiana
People from Many, Louisiana
People from Mansfield, Louisiana
Mayors of places in Louisiana
Democratic Party members of the Louisiana House of Representatives
Speakers of the Louisiana House of Representatives
Democratic Party members of the United States House of Representatives from Louisiana
19th-century American politicians
American lawyers admitted to the practice of law by reading law
19th-century American Episcopalians